"¿Por Qué Te Fuiste?" (English: "¿Why Did You Leave?") is a song by Peruvian singer Maricarmen Marín. It was released on September 2, 2018 and had airplay success throughout Latin America and Europe.

Commercial Performance
The song got lots airplay success throughout Latin America, mainly  in Perú and Bolivia, as well as some countries in Europe. Due to the song's success, Maricarmen set out on her Por Qué Te Fuiste Tour through the continent of America and Europe.

Live performances
Maricarmen performed the song on several television shows to promote it. One of her most notable performances was in the show Yo Soy where she was also a judge.

Music video
The music video was released on the same day as the song on Maricarmen's official YouTube channel and reached over 100,000 views on its first day. In the video, Maricarmen is at a party with her friends and family singing the song with them. While they sing, some people are having memories of loved ones who aren't with them anymore. The video has over 100 million views, making it Maricarmen's most viewed video and the first video by a Peruvian female singer to achieve that. Some parts of the video are shown as flashbacks in Maricarmen's video for her 2019 hit song La Copita, which is a sequel to ¿Por Qué Te Fuiste?.

Charts

Weekly charts

Year-end charts

Awards and nominations
The song was nominated in for Video of the Year and Super Q of the Year at the Premios Q De Oro in 2018.

References 

Peruvian songs
2018 singles
Spanish-language songs
2018 songs